is a passenger railway station in located in the town of Kushimoto, Higashimuro District, Wakayama Prefecture, Japan, operated by West Japan Railway Company (JR West).

Lines

Station layout
The station consists of one island platform connected to the station building by a footbridge. The station is unattended.

Platforms

Adjacent stations

|-
!colspan=5|West Japan Railway Company (JR West)

History
Koza Station opened on December 11, 1936. With the privatization of the Japan National Railways (JNR) on April 1, 1987, the station came under the aegis of the West Japan Railway Company.

Passenger statistics
In fiscal 2019, the station was used by an average of 124 passengers daily (boarding passengers only).

Surrounding Area
 Kushimoto Town Hall Koza Branch Office (former Koza Town Hall)
 Kushimoto Municipal Nishimukai Elementary School
 Kushimoto Municipal Koza Elementary School
 Kushimoto Municipal Koza Junior High Schooll

See also
List of railway stations in Japan

References

External links

 Koza Station (West Japan Railway) 

Railway stations in Wakayama Prefecture
Railway stations in Japan opened in 1936
Kushimoto, Wakayama